TSM may refer to:

Taiwan Semiconductor Manufacturing Company, a semiconductor foundry
IBM Tivoli Storage Manager, a backup software product
Texas Student Media, a student media operation of The University of Texas at Austin
Toulouse School of Management, a French management college
Trinity School for Ministry, a seminary in Pennsylvania
Trapezoidal Shadow Map, a technique for real-time shadow mapping
Team SoloMid, a professional esports organization
Team service management, a management framework
Trusted service manager, a business role in the mobile payment environment
Teaching-suggestion-motivation, a test of inventive step and non-obviousness in patent law
Superior Military Court, one of the federal courts of Brazil
Station code for Tasikmalaya railway station

Entertainment
The Shrinking Man, a 1956 novel
The Simpsons Movie, a 2007 film
The Suicide Machines, a punk band
Toy Story Mania!, a theme park attraction
Skull Man, 2 manga and 1 anime series

Games
The Sims Medieval, a 2011 video game
Team SoloMid, a professional electronic sports team and gaming community website